Senator Bryant may refer to:

Angela Bryant (born 1951), North Carolina State Senate
Bristoe Bryant, (1906–1986), Michigan State Senate
Bruce S. Bryant (born 1961), Maine State Senate
George E. Bryant (1832–1907), Wisconsin State Senate
Kevin L. Bryant (born 1967), South Carolina State Senate
Wayne R. Bryant (born 1947), New Jersey State Senate
William P. Bryant (1806–1860), Indiana State Senate

See also
Bryant (surname)
Senator Bryan (disambiguation)